Kopparavandlapalle is a village of nearly 130 houses near the city of Tirupathi in Andhra Pradesh, India. The village includes three temples dedicated to the gods Gurrappa, Gangamma and Srirama.

References

Villages in Tirupati district
Tirupati